The Copa del Generalísimo 1960 Final was the 58th final of the King's Cup. The final was played at Santiago Bernabéu Stadium in Madrid, on 26 June 1960, being won by Club Atlético de Madrid, who beat Real Madrid 3–1.

Details

See also
Madrid derby

References

1960
Copa
Real Madrid CF matches
Atlético Madrid matches
Madrid Derby matches